Infundibulum tomlini is a species of sea snail, a marine gastropod mollusk in the family Trochidae, the top snails.

Description
The width of the shell attains 36 mm.

Distribution
This marine species occurs off Western Samoa, the Loyalty Islands and Vanuatu.

References

 Fulton (1930), Descriptions of new species of Fusinus, Biplex, Trochus and Bushia; Proceedings of the Malacological Society of London vol. 19 16-17

External links
 To Biodiversity Heritage Library (1 publication)
 To Encyclopedia of Life
 To World Register of Marine Species
 

tomlini
Gastropods described in 1930